Al Khair is a primary and secondary school in the heart of East Croydon.

History
The school officially opened to the public in 2003 and was enrolled with only five pupils. The sports hall was a converted warehouse and the school itself was an office. The founder of the school is Imam Qasim Ahmad. He is also the founder of the Al-Khair Foundation.

In over ten years, the school has evolved into a fully fledged primary and secondary school, with over 350 pupils.

External links

Official site

2003 establishments in England
Educational institutions established in 2003
Private co-educational schools in London
Private schools in the London Borough of Croydon
Islamic schools in London